The Miss New Hampshire Teen USA competition is the pageant that selects the representative for the state of New Hampshire in the Miss Teen USA pageant. It was directed by The Clemente Organization based in Malden, Massachusetts from 2013 to 2019. GDB Theatre and Pageant Productions became the new directors for the event starting from 2020 competition.

In terms of number of placements New Hampshire is one of the least successful states. From 1983 to 2007 their only placement was when Janel Bishop won the Miss Teen USA title in 1991 becoming the 8th state that won the Miss Teen USA title for the first time.

Two New Hampshire teens have competed at Miss USA, one after winning the Miss New Hampshire USA and one as Miss New York USA.

Grace Paradise of Plaistow was crowned Miss New Hampshire Teen USA 2022 on May 1, 2022, at  Capitol Center for the Arts in Concord. She will represent New Hampshire for the title of Miss Teen USA 2022.

Results summary

Placements
Miss Teen USAs: Janelle Bishop (1991)
Top 15: Courtney Morgan (2008)
New Hampshire holds a record of 2 placements at Miss Teen USA.

Winners 

1 Age at the time of the Miss Teen USA pageant

References

External links
Official website

New Hampshire
Women in New Hampshire